The 1925 Saint Mary's Saints football team was an American football team that represented Saint Mary's College of California during the 1925 college football season.  In their fifth season under head coach Slip Madigan, the Gaels compiled an 8–2 record (3–0 against conference opponents), won the  inaugural Far Western Conference championship, and outscored opponents by a combined total of 313 to 72.

Center Larry Bettencourt was selected by Norman E. Brown as a first-team player on the 1925 All-Pacific Coast football team; he was later inducted into the College Football Hall of Fame. Other key players on the team included "Ducky" Grant (captain), Jimmy Underhill (halfback/end), Red Strader (fullback), Dutch Conlan (quarterback), Boyd "Cowboy" Smith (halfback), and Pat O'Rourke (end).

Schedule

References

Saint Mary's
Saint Mary's Gaels football seasons
Northern California Athletic Conference football champion seasons
Saint Mary's Saints football